C. darwinii may refer to:

 Caberea darwinii
 Calceolaria darwinii, a perennial plant originally from Tierra del Fuego in the southern part of South America
 Camponotus darwinii, Forel, 1886, a carpenter ant species in the genus Camponotus 
 Carex darwinii
 Cladonia darwinii
 Cosmocalanus darwinii
 Cyttaria darwinii, the type species of Cyttaria, a genus of ascomycete fungi

See also
 C. darwini (disambiguation)
 Darwinii (disambiguation)